Kenlis is a small farming community in Abernethy Rural Municipality No. 186, Saskatchewan, Canada. The community is located 10 km south of the village of Abernethy close to the Qu'appelle Valley on range road 112 about 15 km northeast of the town of Indian Head.

History

When the Canadian Pacific Railway constructed tracks through the village of Abernethy many residents and businesses from Kenis moved to be closer to the rail line. The Kenlis 
United Church and a Cairn Memorial to the school are still located on the former town site. Every summer the congregation from the United Church in Abernethy have a service in the old Kenlis Church. The Kenlis cemetery also still exists approximately two miles to the north with occasional burials still taking place.

See also
 List of communities in Saskatchewan
 Hamlets of Saskatchewan

References

Abernethy No. 186, Saskatchewan
Unincorporated communities in Saskatchewan
Ghost towns in Saskatchewan
Division No. 6, Saskatchewan